Pastak (also known as Alamān, ‘Alēmān, ‘Alimān, Ālmān, Ayman, and Pastak Ālmān) is a village in Pir Bazar Rural District, in the Central District of Rasht County, Gilan Province, Iran. At the 2006 census, its population was 126, in 37 families.

References 

Populated places in Rasht County